Jamalabad (also Romanized as Jamālābād; also known as Chamalābād and Chamlābād) is a village in Qarah Kahriz Rural District, Qarah Kahriz District, Shazand County, Markazi Province, Iran. At the 2006 census, its population was 588, in 157 families.

References 

Populated places in Shazand County